Gare de Sète is the railway station serving the town of Sète in the Hérault département of southern France. It is the eastern terminus of the Bordeaux–Sète railway.

Train services
The station is served by the following service(s):

High-speed services (TGV) Paris–Valence–Nîmes–Montpellier (- Béziers)
High-speed services (TGV) Paris–Lyon–Nîmes–Montpellier–Narbonne–Perpignan
High-speed service (TGV) Paris–Valence–Nîmes–Montpellier–Perpignan–Barcelona
Intercity services (Intercités) Bordeaux–Toulouse–Montpellier–Marseille
Regional service (TER Occitanie) Narbonne–Béziers–Montpellier–Nîmes–Avignon
Regional service (TER Occitanie) Cerbère–Perpignan–Narbonne–Montpellier–Nîmes–Avignon
Regional service (TER Occitanie) Narbonne–Montpellier–Nîmes–Arles–Marseille

References

Railway stations in Hérault
Railway stations in France opened in 1839